List of films produced in Silent Film in Bengali film industry in the Bengali language.

1917–1920

1921 in film

1922 in film

1923 in film

1924 in film

1925 in film

1926 in film

1927 in film

1928 in film

1929 in film

1930 in film

1931 in film

1932 in film

1934 in film

Gallery

Notes

References
Bengali Film Directory– Edited by Ansu Sur, Nandan, Calcutta, 1999

External links
TollyNewZ.com A Portal on Bengali Cinema
Bengali cinema at www.calcuttaweb.com
History
www.banglacinema.net A Portal on Bengali Cinema
www.bengalifilm.com
Indian Cinema Database

Indian silent films
Cinema of Bengal
Silent Bengali